The United National Movement was a political party in Saint Kitts-Nevis-Anguilla. The party first contested national elections in 1961, when they received 7.3% of the vote and won two seats. In the 1966 elections their vote share fell to 5.9% and they lost one of their two seats. In the 1971 elections their vote share dropped again, this time to 4.4% and they lost their sole seat. The party did not contest any further elections.

References

Political parties in Saint Kitts and Nevis
1960s in Saint Kitts-Nevis-Anguilla
1970s in Saint Kitts-Nevis-Anguilla